"Little" James 'Jimmy' Corkhill Jr. was a fictional character in the defunct Channel 4 soap opera Brookside.  He was portrayed by George Christopher and first appeared between 1991 and 1992. Little Jimmy resented his father, Jimmy for a number of years having caught him having sex with his aunt, Val Walker.

In 1996, Little Jimmy returned to Brookside Close after spending time in a French prison for drug-related offences. On his release, he returned home, with Jimmy Corkhill (in a transit van on a ferry from France). Jimmy and Jackie were then determined to wean him off his addiction. This did not happen, and at a real low point for the Corkhills, Jimmy senior bowed to his son's wishes, who was going through cold turkey, and supplied him with a heroin fix. However, the catalyst for little Jimmy's fate was when mother, Jackie Corkhill discovered he had smuggled a large amount of heroin back into Britain, strapping it to his abdomen. In a fit of rage she then managed to get hold of it and flushed it down the toilet of the family home. A few months later, two gangster figures came looking for Jimmy, presumably to collect the heroin that they had laid Jimmy with. They met Ron Dixon at the Parade, who mistook them for plain-clothes detectives and gave them the Corkhills' address. He did this to get back at Jimmy senior, who he had a long feud with. Little Jimmy's body was later found by his father after being murdered by the drug dealers who were looking for him.

In November 1996, during a scene in which Little Jimmy breaks into the Dixons' house, the character was portrayed by another actor, Paul Sanders. This was due to the scene needing to be re-shot, and after regular actor George Christopher had left the show. The scene was filmed from behind and below the shoulders, leaving viewers to guess the identity of the burglar.

References

Corkhill, Jimmy Jr.
Corkhill, Jimmy Jr.
Corkhill, Jimmy Jr.